The Great South Road was the northern section of the earliest highway between Auckland and Wellington, in the North Island of New Zealand.

History 
Construction of the Great South Road began in 1861 during the New Zealand Wars under the orders of Governor Grey to improve supply lines through swampy and thickly forested country. The road was constructed by British Army troops, including Dominic Jacotin Gamble, and provided a flow of supplies for the Waikato campaign. Queen's Redoubt at Pōkeno was a major base of operations for soldiers working on constructing the road. Approximately 12,000 soldiers were involved in the construction over two years. After the wars, more peaceful uses predominated, and the road became the main social and commercial link to the growing agricultural areas south of Auckland.

Much of the road between Newmarket and Drury is laid in concrete, up to 1 foot thick but is now covered with asphalt. Originally, the road was marked by milestones, but these are now all believed lost, although there is a ‘22 mile’ milestone marker outside Drury School, in Drury. The Auckland Southern Motorway has largely superseded Great South Road as a through route, but many parts of the road are still in use, particularly the urban sections.

Route 
The road begins in the central Auckland suburb of Epsom, then passes through the suburbs of Greenlane, Penrose, Ōtāhuhu, Papatoetoe, Manukau, Manurewa and Papakura.  Leaving the urban sprawl, it heads south through Drury before terminating at Mill Road in Bombay and merging with the Waikato Expressway.

Historically it continued, over the Bombay Hills, and followed the east bank of the Waikato River until crossing it at Ngāruawāhia. A section of State Highway 3 through Ōhaupō retains the road's southernmost extension.

Major intersections

See also
New Zealand state highway network

References

External links
NZ Geographic article
Dominic Gamble Soldier involved in road construction
 Manukau timeline

Streets in Auckland